Jacques Albert is a Canadian electrical engineer, currently a Canada Research Chair in Advanced Photonic Components at Carleton University and a Fellow of The Optical Society.

References

Year of birth missing (living people)
Living people
Academic staff of Carleton University
Canadian electrical engineers